The Wisenberg (1,002 m) is a wooded mountain of the Jura Mountains, located between Häfelfingen and Wisen in northern Switzerland. The summit lies within the canton of Basel-Landschaft, near the border with the canton of Solothurn. The Wisenberg is both the northernmost and easternmost summit above 1,000 metres in the Jura Mountains.

On the summit is an observation tower.

References

External links

Wisenberg on Hikr

Mountains of Switzerland
Mountains of Basel-Landschaft
Mountains of the Jura
Mountains of the canton of Solothurn
One-thousanders of Switzerland
Basel-Landschaft–Solothurn border